Cheng Chao-tsun (born 17 October 1993) is a Taiwanese track and field athlete who competes in the javelin throw. His personal best of 91.36 m, set in 2017, is the Asian record.

Competition record

References

1993 births
Living people
Taiwanese male javelin throwers
Athletes (track and field) at the 2014 Asian Games
Athletes (track and field) at the 2018 Asian Games
Athletes (track and field) at the 2010 Summer Youth Olympics
Universiade medalists in athletics (track and field)
Universiade gold medalists for Chinese Taipei
Asian Games competitors for Chinese Taipei
Asian Athletics Championships winners
Fu Jen Catholic University alumni
Medalists at the 2017 Summer Universiade
Athletes (track and field) at the 2020 Summer Olympics
Olympic athletes of Taiwan